Nuclear Furniture is the eighth album by American rock band Jefferson Starship, released in June 1984 through Grunt Records. It was the final album by the band before the departure of leader Paul Kantner and the eventual transition of the remaining members of the group to become Starship.

Background
Produced by Ron Nevison, the album was arranged with the help of Austrian producer Peter Wolf (unrelated to the J. Geils Band singer of the same name), who had previously worked with Grace Slick on her solo album, Software. Wolf also contributed keyboard and synthesizer work to the album, although not an official part of the band. Wolf and his wife Ina also wrote the single "No Way Out", the first of many songs penned by the duo that took the future Starship in a more commercial direction.

As the album was being recorded, Paul Kantner became frustrated with the album's direction. Before the sessions came to a close, he stole the master tapes, put them in his car, and drove around San Francisco for a few days, and would not return them until the band mixed the album in a way more to his liking. Shortly after the album's release, Kantner left the band, and he only appears in the first promotional video produced, "No Way Out". After the departure of Kantner, the band lost the "Jefferson" moniker and became Starship; there would not be another studio album released under the Jefferson Starship name until after Kantner reformed the band in 1992.

Reception

Nuclear Furniture was released in 1984 and spawned the Top 40 single "No Way Out", which was also the first single by any incarnation of the band to hit No. 1 on the Mainstream Rock Tracks chart. The album itself reached No. 28.

Joseph McCombs of AllMusic rated the album 2 out of 5 stars and described it as a "competent but rather forgettable collection of radio-friendly dual guitar/keyboard period pop tunes." McCombs said that the juxtaposition between Kantner's politically-oriented songs and Thomas's more commercially-oriented songs "makes for an intriguing if uneven album."

Track listing

Personnel
Mickey Thomas – lead (1-5, 8, 9, 11) and backing vocals, spoken word (11)
Grace Slick – lead (3, 5, 7, 8, 10, 11) and backing vocals, spoken word (11)
Paul Kantner – lead (5, 6, 11) and backing vocals, rhythm guitar, banjo (11), spoken word (11)
Craig Chaquico – lead guitar, spoken word (11)
David Freiberg – keyboards (2, 6, 8, 9, 11) Moog (5, 8), piano (9), backing vocals, spoken word (11)
Pete Sears – bass, synthesizers (1, 3–5, 10) piano (5), backing vocals, spoken word (11)
Donny Baldwin – drums (1-6, 8-11), hand claps (1, 9), roto toms (1, 4, 5, 11), backing vocals, spoken word (11)

Additional personnel
Peter Wolf – synthesizer programming, LinnDrum programming (1, 4, 9)
Brian MacLeod – Simmons drums (7)

Production
Jefferson Starship – arrangements
Ron Nevison – producer, engineer, arrangements
Peter Wolf – arrangements
Maureen Droney – assistant engineer
Kevin Eddy – assistant mixing engineer
Mike Reese – mastering
Pat Ieraci (Maurice) – production coordinator
Rod Dyer, Clive Pierce / Dyer / Kahn, Inc. – cover design
Tracks recorded at The Automatt, San Francisco
Over-dubs and mixing at The Plant, Sausalito
Mastered at The Mastering Lab, Hollywood
Bill Thompson – manager

Singles / music videos
"No Way Out" (1984)
"Layin' It on the Line" (1984)
"Sorry Me, Sorry You" (1984)

Charts
Album

Singles

References

Jefferson Starship albums
1984 albums
Albums produced by Ron Nevison
Grunt Records albums